KGRB may refer to:

 KGRB (FM), a radio station (94.3 FM) licensed to serve Jackson, California, United States
 KALI (AM), a radio station (900 AM) in West Covina, California, United States, which held the call sign KGRB from 1961 to 1996
 KGRB, the ICAO code for Austin Straubel International Airport
 Korea Game Rating Board, the former name of the Game Rating and Administration Committee of South Korea